Parliamentary elections were held in Moldova on 28 November 2010 after parliamentary vote failed to elect a President for the second time in late 2009.

Background
After the constitutional referendum failed to meet the 33% turnout required to validate the results, the Constitutional Court of Moldova ruled that acting president of Moldova, Mihai Ghimpu had to dissolve the parliament and hold new elections. Ghimpu then announced that the parliament would be dissolved on 28 September 2010 and new elections would be held on 28 November 2010.

Electoral system
The electoral threshold varied for different organizations; for electoral blocs of three or more parties it was 9%; for blocs of two parties it was 7%, and for individual parties it was 4%. Individual candidates could also run, but needed to receive at least 2% of the vote to win a seat. A total of 39 contestants; 20 political parties and 19 independent candidates. The Constitution states that the Parliament must elect the President with a majority of at least 61 votes (from a total of 101). After two failed attempts the Parliament must be dissolved and the interim president must set the date for a new parliamentary election.

Campaign
The Liberal Democratic Party of Moldova (PLDM), Democratic Party of Moldova (PDM), and the Liberal Party (PL) formed the Alliance for European Integration (AIE) in a grand coalition against the Party of Communists of the Republic of Moldova (PCRM). The Alliance sought integration into the European Union (EU).

Opinion polls
According to the Chișinău-based Institute of Marketing and Polls IMAS-INC, a poll during the period of July 26-August 12 showed 42% of respondents trusted PLDM, 35% trusted PCRM, 35% - PDM and 30% - the PL.

Exit polls
There were two exit polls made for two TV stations, both failing to predict the outcome within the margin of error:

Results

The Communists (PCRM) won 42 seats, while the Liberal Democrats (PLDM) won 32, the Democratic Party (PDM) 15, and the Liberals (PL) 12. This gave the Alliance for European Integration (AEI) 59 seats, two short of the 61 needed to elect a President. The result thus maintained the status quo following the contemporaneous constitutional deadlock. Observers from the Organization for Security and Co-operation in Europe and the Council of Europe lauded the election, with the head of the Parliamentary Assembly delegation of OSCE, Tonino Picula, saying "These elections reflected the will of the people."

By district

Aftermath
Even though the Alliance for European Integration did not get the supermajority needed to elect the president, the leaders of the three parties of the alliance pledged a new coalition agreement on 30 December. Their new cabinet was installed on 14 January 2011, when an investiture vote took place in parliament.

Moldova's highest court ruled on 8 February 2011 that the government could stay in place without early elections even if they were still unable to elect a new president.

Elected MPs
The list of deputies elected:

References

External links
2010 parliamentary elections eDemocracy
Table with results by electoral districts Voteaza.md 

Moldova
2010 elections in Moldova
Parliamentary elections in Moldova